Eucithara dubiosa is a small sea snail, a marine gastropod mollusk in the family Mangeliidae.

Distribution
This marine species is found off Mauritius and the Andaman Islands.

Description
The length of the shell attains 7.5 mm.

The color of the shell is white, with a broad brown stain on the back of the body whorl. The ribs are narrow, straight, not on the shoulder. The interstices are closely striated.

References

 Nevill, G. & Nevill, H. 1875. Descriptions of nine marine Mollusca from the Indian Ocean. 1. Asiatic Soc. Bengal [n.s.] 44(2): 8~104, pis 7,8.

External links
  Tucker, J.K. 2004 Catalog of recent and fossil turrids (Mollusca: Gastropoda). Zootaxa 682:1-1295
 Kilburn R.N. 1992. Turridae (Mollusca: Gastropoda) of southern Africa and Mozambique. Part 6. Subfamily Mangeliinae, section 1. Annals of the Natal Museum, 33: 461–575

dubiosa
Gastropods described in 1875